was a 40-story commercial skyscraper located in Hamamatsuchō, Minato, Tokyo. Completed in 1970, the building is one of Japan's earliest skyscrapers. Upon its completion, the 163-meter-tall WTC Building took the title of Japan's tallest skyscraper from the Kasumigaseki Building; it retained this title until Keio Plaza Hotel's North Tower was completed one year later.

The building is home to World Trade Center Tokyo, a member of the World Trade Centers Association. It is primarily used for office space, but it also includes retail stores and restaurants. The building's top floor is a visitor observatory. The building is connected to the Toei Subways's Daimon Station and Hamamatsuchō Station, which is serviced by two JR East lines and the Tokyo Monorail.

Office tenants
The building serves as the headquarters of KYB Corporation, a global automotive company.

Redevelopment
In March 2013, about 3.2 hectares of "Hamamatsucho 2-chome 4 district" on the west side of Hamamatsucho station was declared by a city planning decision as a special urban regeneration district . [10] In response, the construction of five new buildings is planned, including the reconstruction of the entire area. The demolition of a 152-meter skyscraper is the largest ever.

In 2014, the World Trade Center Building was purchased by the Nippon Life Insurance Company, which plans to demolish the building to allow for construction of a new office building on the site.

Development was started separately for District A, District B, and District C. In District A, the South Building of the World Trade Center Building (3 floors below ground, 39 floors above ground) was completed in March 2021.  The main building and bus terminal of the same building are scheduled to be completed in March 2017, a new Tokyo Monorail Hamamatsucho Station in May 2027.  The B Street District Nippon Life Hamamatsucho Claire Tower (3 floors above the 29th floor underground) was completed in August 2018.  A complex promoted by the Redevelopment Association (2 floors below ground, 46 floors above ground) is scheduled to be completed in December 2026 and will be constructed in District C. This building would later be called the World Trade Center North.

By the end of June 2021, the 152 metre tall building was closed prior to its demolition.

See also

List of tallest buildings and structures in Tokyo

References

External links

WTC Building official site

|-

|-

Skyscraper office buildings in Tokyo
Tokyo
Retail buildings in Tokyo
Former skyscrapers
Office buildings completed in 1970